G Live is an arts centre in Guildford, Surrey, England. The venue was officially opened by Prince Edward, Duke of Kent in February 2012.

Background
Guildford Civic Hall was the town's main arts and entertainment venue. It closed in January 2004 and was replaced on the same site by the new live entertainment and conference venue, G Live, which opened in September 2011. The new building incorporates 80% of the structural material from its predecessor. The venue cost £26m.

G Live is operated by HQ Theatres Limited Guildford on behalf of Guildford Borough Council. The name was chosen by local members of the public.

Facilities
The venue has a main auditorium with a capacity of 1000 seated or 1700 for standing events, a 100 seat studio theatre, known as the Bellerby Studio, and also conference rooms.

2013 accident
On Saturday morning, 9 February 2013, a tour manager from the singing group Fisherman's Friends was killed by a falling metal door at the venue. The group were due to have performed at the venue. One of the singers of the group also suffered critical injuries when the door fell and later also died in hospital. In November 2015 David Naylor, 56, from Bridgnorth, Shropshire, was charged with two counts of manslaughter by gross negligence.
In November 2016, Naylor was cleared of manslaughter, and Express Hi-Fold Doors Limited was fined £30,000 for breaches of health and safety laws.

References

External links
 

Arts centres in England
Theatres in Surrey
2011 establishments in England
Buildings and structures in Guildford